The Olympus PEN E-PL3 announced on 30 June 2011 is Olympus Corporation's seventh camera that adheres to the Micro Four Thirds (MFT) system design standard.  The E-PL3 succeeds the Olympus PEN E-PL2, and was announced in concert with two other models, the Olympus PEN E-P3 (the flagship version), and the Olympus PEN E-PM1 (a new "Mini" version of the PEN camera line with similar features to the E-PL3).  The E-PL3 is commonly said to be the "Lite" (less full featured) version of the E-P3, much as the E-PL1 and E-PL2 were "Lite" versions of the E-P1 and E-P2, respectively.

Technology
The E-PL3 addresses some of the concerns that critics had about previous PEN models: slow handling, due to slow autofocus speed and difficulty seeing the LCD panel under certain (e.g., bright, sunny) conditions.

The E-PL3 increases autofocus speed through use of a 120 Hz refresh rate for its sensor, similar to the technology used in the recently released Panasonic Lumix DMC-GH2 and G3 cameras.  Olympus claims, based on in-house testing, that the E-PL3, along with its E-PM1 cousin, have similar characteristics to the flagship E-P3, which according to Olympus has the world's fastest autofocus speed of any camera as of the product announcement date. The benefits of the 120 Hz refresh rate also provides the ability for continuous autofocus tracking during bursts of exposures, a faster shutter response (less lag) and less blackout time between exposures.

The E-PL3 lacks the E-P3 capacitive touchscreen for creative camera control, and the E-P3 OLED type display that is supposed to vastly improve performance in sunny conditions, and off-angle viewing.  Instead, the E-PL3 has a tiltable LCD, which allows easy above the head, waist level, or low off the ground viewing. The E-PL3 continues with the proprietary Accessory Port, a power and communication port, which allows the use of various accessories, such as an external stereo microphone for HD video recording, LED macro lights, and a bluetooth communications adapter.  The accessory port continues to be compatible with the high resolution, optional hotshoe mounted VF-2 electronic viewfinder (EVF).

The VF-2 had a flip angle eyepiece, allowing viewing from 0–90 degrees.  The VF-2 had been criticized for being very expensive and for not having a locking device, with some users reporting easy dislodgement of the VF-2 from the hotshoe.  To address these criticisms, in July 2011, Olympus announced the introduction of an optional VF-3 EVF, which has a lower resolution and a locking device.

Differences over Olympus PEN E-P1
 Addition of an Accessory Port that can be used for an electronic viewfinder, external microphone or external flash
 Two new Art filters-simulating Diorama and Cross process in camera
 Black finish widely available
 Auto focus tracking
 Colour boosting function named i-Enhance

Specifications not in the infobox
 1080 Full HD video at 60i frames per second in AVCHD format with Fine and Normal modes (frame/s)

See also
 Olympus PEN E-PL1

Micro Four Thirds Camera introduction roadmap

References

External links

Olympus PEN E-PL3 Product Site
Olympus PEN E-PL3 Review - dpreview.com
Olympus PEN E-PL3 Review - imaging-resource.com
Olympus PEN E-PL3 Review - photographyblog.com

PEN E-PL3
Live-preview digital cameras
Cameras introduced in 2011